The 2024 U Sports Men's Final 8 Basketball Tournament is scheduled to be held in March 2024, in Quebec City, Quebec, to determine a national champion for the 2023–24 U Sports men's basketball season.

Host
The tournament is scheduled to be hosted by Université Laval at the school's Amphithéâtre Desjardins. This would be the first time that the school has hosted the men's championship, while also being the first time that the province of Quebec has hosted.

Scheduled teams
Canada West Representative
OUA Representative
RSEQ Representative
AUS Representative
Host (Laval Rouge et Or)
Three additional berths

References

External links
 Tournament Web Site

2023–24 in Canadian basketball
U Sports Men's Basketball Championship
2024 in men's basketball
Université Laval
Basketball in Quebec